Below is the list of ancient settlements in Turkey. There are innumerable ruins of ancient settlements spread all over the country. While some ruins date back to Neolithic times, most of them were settlements of Hittites, Phrygians, Lydians, Ionians, Urartians, and so on.

List of settlements

In the table below, only the settlements which have articles in this encyclopaedia are shown, with the exception of the following: 
A few ancient settlements are still in use (Adana, Amasya, Ankara, İstanbul, Tarsus etc.) These settlements are not included in the list unless separate articles for the ancient sites exist.
Some ancient settlements which were well documented are known by name, but so far they have not been unearthed and their exact locations are obscure. (For example; Washukanni, the capital of Mittani.)

A-An

Ap-Az

B

E

I

M

O

S

T

See also 
Ancient kingdoms of Anatolia

Notes 

Turkey history-related lists
Turkey

.